Labour Force Surveys are statistical surveys conducted in a number of countries designed to capture data about the labour market. All European Union member states are required to conduct a Labour Force Survey annually. Labour Force Surveys are also carried out in some non-EU countries. They are used to calculate the International Labour Organization (ILO)-defined unemployment rate. The ILO agrees the definitions and concepts employed in Labour Force Surveys.

History

European Union
Prior to 1998, EU member states were required to conduct an LFS in one quarter per year, but as a result of Council Regulation (EEC) No. 577/98 of 9 March 1998 they are now expected to submit LFS results for every quarter to Eurostat. Most, though not all, participating countries changed their LFSs to continuous surveys in the period 1998 to 2004. Responsibility for sample selection, questionnaire design and fieldwork lies with member states' national statistical offices, who then forward the results to Eurostat, employing a common coding scheme.

The EU LFS, as it is known, covers not only the EU member states but also three of the four European Free Trade Association countries (Iceland, Norway and Switzerland) and candidate countries.

United Kingdom
The Office for National Statistics (ONS) conducted the United Kingdom's first Labour Force Survey in 1973 and repeated it every two years until 1983. It is curated by the UK Data Service and can be accessed for research through them . The European Community then introduced a requirement for all of its member states to conduct an LFS (following Brexit the UK is now no longer a member state) and the ONS introduced a quarterly element to its LFS. The UK switched to a full quarterly survey in 1992, initially with seasonal quarters but moving to calendar quarters in 2006.

Australia
The first Australian LFS was conducted by the Australian Bureau of Statistics (ABS) in November 1960. Initially, the LFS was conducted only in state capitals, in February, May, August, and November, but in February 1964 it was rolled out to the whole of Australia. The last quarterly survey was conducted in November 1977. The LFS became monthly in February 1978, when the range of topics covered was increased and the LFS measure became the official measure of unemployment.

New Zealand
New Zealand's quarterly Household Labour Force Survey was established in December 1985. It was revised in 1990 to include new variables including underemployment.

Usage
In addition to being used to generate official statistics, data from the LFS are employed by academics and other researchers. In the UK, for example, the LFS has been used as a data source for research projects on topics such as female employment, the economic returns to education, migration and ethnic minority groups.

References

External links
Volume 3: Economically active population, employment, unemployment and hours of work (household surveys) of the International Labour Organization's Sources and Methods: Labour Statistics: provides details of the labour force and household surveys conducted by a range of countries

International Labour Organization
Quantitative research
Unemployment
Social statistics data
Statistical data agreements